Birinci Yeniyol (also, Yeniyël Pervoye) is a village and municipality in the Ismailli Rayon of Azerbaijan.  It has a population of 553. The municipality consists of the villages of Birinci Yeniyol, İkinci Yeniyol, and Qərsələ.

References 

Populated places in Ismayilli District